Mount Yakovlev is a somewhat isolated mountain about 11 miles (18 km) north of Sarkofagen Mountain in the Russkiye Mountains, Queen Maud Land. Mapped by Norsk Polarinstitutt from air photos taken by Norwegian Antarctic Expedition in 1958–59. Also observed in 1959 by the Soviet Antarctic Expedition and named for noted Soviet paleontologist N.N. Yakovlev.

Mountains of Queen Maud Land
Princess Astrid Coast